is a style of Aikido and organization founded in Los Angeles, California in 1981 by Roderick Kobayashi, formerly a top instructor in the Ki Society. Kobayashi brought to the new organization the strong influence of his teacher Koichi Tohei, and Shin Shin Toitsu Aikido. Although independent and never formally affiliated with any parent organization, Seidokan's style and teachings were recognized by 2nd Dōshu Kisshomaru Ueshiba as a legitimate interpretation of the teachings of his father, Aikido founder Morihei Ueshiba.

The organization, which has its headquarters dojo at the Aikido Institute of Michigan in Battle Creek, has branch dojos in several US states, Israel, and Tokyo, Japan.

References

 
 
 

Aikido organizations